Yevgeny Aleksandrovich Yevstigneyev (9 October 1926 — 4 March 1992) was a prominent Soviet and Russian stage and film actor, theatre pedagogue, one of the founders of the Moscow Sovremennik Theatre. He was named People's Artist of the USSR in 1983 and awarded the USSR State Prize in 1974.

Early years
Yevgeny Yevstigneyev was born on 9 October 1926 in Nizhny Novgorod, Russian SFSR (modern day Nizhny Novgorod Oblast of Russia) into a poor working-class family and spent his childhood at the outskirts in the Volodarsky village. He was a late child of Maria Ivanovna Yevstigneyeva (née Chernishova), a milling machine operator, and a metallurgist Aleksandr Mikhailovich Yevstigneyev who was twenty years older than her and who died when Yevgeny was six years old. Maria Ivanovna married another man who died when Yevgeny turned seventeen.

By that time he had already finished seven classes of secondary school and applied as a mechanic to the same factory where his mother was working. Yet he dreamed of acting, just like his elder half-brother who served as a comedy actor in the local theatre and died very young, which made his mother to believe that it was a bad sign; she asked the recruiting manager to keep her son's documents and don't let him leave.

During that period Yevgeny became interested in jazz and started playing drums with a jazz band that performed in cinemas. There he was noticed by the director of the Gorky Theatre School (known as Y. A. Yevstigneyev Theatre School of Nizhny Novgorod today) who invited him to join. Yevgeny passed the entering exams in 1947 and graduated in 1951.

Career
He became an actor of the Vladimir Regional Drama Theatre where he served from 1951 to 1954. He quickly rose to fame as the most talented and versatile actor of Vladimir, performing 23 roles in total. In 1954 a Moscow Art Theatre actor Mikhail Zimin who had previously studied with Yevstigneyev returned for him and asked to join the Nemirovich-Danchenko School-Studio at MKhAT. Yevgeny was accepted and went straight to the third course, graduating in 1956 and becoming an actor of the Moscow Art Theatre where he served for a year.

In 1957 a number of young MAT actors including Yevgeny Yevstigneyev and his close friend Oleg Yefremov founded the Sovremennik Theatre where he served till 1970. The role of the king in Evgeny Schwartz's play Naked King which was staged in 1960 by Yefremov became his most recognized stage role since. Soon he performed in the leading role of a Young Pioneer camp administrator in the comedy movie Welcome, or No Trespassing. It turned a big hit and gave a great push to his successful movie career which lasted for 35 years and resulted in over 100 roles.

Possessing a brilliant gift of a comic and dramatic actor, Yevstigneyev was immensely popular. His appearance in any film or play guaranteed it a success with viewers. Among his unforgettable performances was the portrayal of Professor Preobrazhensky in Heart of a Dog.

In 1970 Oleg Yefremov was appointed the main director of the Moscow Art Theatre and left Sovremennik. Yevstigneyev followed him along with some other actors, although, according to his colleague Igor Kvasha, he was against this move and tried to convince everyone to stay at Sovremennik. He performed in MAT up until 1988. From 1976 to 1986 he also taught acting at the Moscow Art Theatre School, becoming a professor in 1977.

Last years
During the late 1980s he started experiencing heart problems and survived a heart attack. In 1988 he asked Yefremov not to give him additional roles. Yefremov then suggested him to retire. This deeply hurt Yevstigneyev's feelings and he left the theatre. During 1990-1992 he performed in several plays in combination companies. He also starred in an epic historical mini-series Yermak (released posthumously in 1996) as Ivan the Terrible which became his last role.

In 1991 Nikolai Gubenko, at the time a Soviet Ministry of Culture, contacted a famous British cardiologist Thomas Lewis and sent Yevstigneyev and his wife to London. After an examination Lewis told Yevstigneyev that he would perform a surgery, but the actor had no chances. This greatly affected Yevstigneyev, and in five minutes he survived another heart attack which led to coma and his death in several hours.

Yevgeny Yevstigneyev was transported back to Moscow and buried at the Novodevichy Cemetery. He was survived by his third wife, an actress Irina Tsivina (born 1963), his son from the first marriage to Galina Volchek — a prominent Russian film director and cinematographer Denis Yevstigneyev (born 1961), and a daughter from his second marriage to an actress Lilia Yevstigneyeva — Maria Selyanskaya (born 1968) who performs at the Sovremennik Theatre.

Selected filmography

 Duel (1957) as Captain Peterson
 Ballad of a Soldier (Баллада о солдате, 1959) as a truck driver
 Tri rasskaza Chekhova (1960) as The Painter (segment "Anyuta")
 Lyubushka (1961) as Filipp Akimovich
 V trudnyy chas (1961)
 Man Follows the Sun (Человек идёт за солнцем, 1962) as Nikolai, motorcycle racer
 Nine Days in One Year (Девять дней одного года, 1962) as Nikolai Ivanovich
 Molodo-zeleno (1962) as Vasiliy Zhokhov
 Nevermore (1962) as Aleksandr Aleksin - novyy direktor sudostroitelnogo zavoda
 Strictly Business (Деловые люди, 1962) as Citizen (voice)
 They Conquer the Skies (1963) as Head Constructor Ivan Sergeyevich
 Sotrudnik ChK (1964)
 Welcome, or No Trespassing (Добро пожаловать, или Посторонним вход воспрещён, 1964) as Dynin
 Khotite - verte, khotite - net... (1964)
 Verte mne, lyudi (1965) as Kostyukov - tatuirovannyy
 Faithfulness (1965) as Ivan Terentievich
 Znoynyy iyul (1965)
 The Hyperboloid of Engineer Garin (Гиперболоид инженера Гарина, 1965) as an engineer Pyotr Garin
 The Bridge Is Built (1966) as Sinajsky
 Beware of the Car (Берегись автомобиля, 1966) as a theatre director
 Wings (Крылья, 1966) as Misha
 The Ugly Story (Скверный анекдот, 1966) as Pralinsky
 Older Sister (Старшая сестра, 1967) as Ogorodnikov
 Stewardess (Стюардесса, 1967, TV Movie) as a drunken passenger
 Oni zhivut ryadom (1968) as Danilov
 The Little Golden Calf (Золотой телёнок, 1968) as Alexander Koreiko
 Just a life – the story of Fridtjof Nansen (1968) as Tsjitsjerin
 Zigzag of Success (Зигзаг удачи, 1968) as Ivan Kalachev
 Eto bylo v razvedke (1969) as Photographer
 Svoy (1969)
 Obvinyayutsya v ubiystve (1969) as Spiridonov
 Staryy dom (1970)
 Kamurjner moratsutyan vrayov (1970) as Man with nails
 Tchaikovsky (Чайковский, 1970) as Herman Laroche
 Strannye lyudi (1970) - (segment "Bratka")
 Moya sudba (1970)
 The Flight (Бег, 1970) as Paramon Korzukhin
 All The King's Men (Вся королевская рать, 1971, TV Mini-Series) as Larson
 Khod beloy korolevy (1972) as Dryzhik
 Property of the Republic (Достояние республики, 1972) as Carl Genrikhovich Vitol
 Grandads-Robbers (Старики-разбойники, 1972) as Valentin Vorobyov
 Fitil (Фитиль, 1972, TV Series) as a drunkard
 Commander of the Lucky  Pike (Командир счастливой «Щуки», 1972) as Stepan Lukich
 Dacha (1973) as Fyodor
 Seventeen Moments of Spring (Семнадцать мгновений весны, 1973, TV Mini-Series) as Professor Pleischner
 Privalov's Millions (Приваловские миллионы, 1973) as Ivan Yakovlevich
 Neylon 100% (1973) as Dentist
 Unbelievable Adventures of Italians in Russia (Невероятные приключения итальянцев в России, 1974) as a lame Italian
 Zhrebiy (1974) as Professor
 Yeshchyo mozhno uspet (1974) as Seglin
 Vkus khalvy (1975) as Vizir
 Na yasnyy ogon (1976) as Piramidov
 Potryasayushchiy Berendeev (1976) as otets Berendeeva
 Fitil (Фитиль, 1976) as an official
 Legenda o Tile (1977) as Priest
 Wounded Game (Подранки, 1977) as a watchman
 Story of an Unknown Actor (1977) as Pavel Goryayev
 The Nose (Нос, 1977, TV Movie) as an official at the post office
 About the Little Red Riding Hood (Про Красную Шапочку, 1977, TV Movie) as an astrologer
 Family Circumstances (По семейным обстоятельствам, 1978) as Nikolai Pavlovich
 Krov i pot (1978) as General Chernov
 The Meeting Place Cannot Be Changed (Место встречи изменить нельзя, 1979, TV Mini-Series) as Ruchechnik
 Primite telegrammu v dolg (1979) as Sashen'ka's father
 Do Not Part with Your Beloved (С любимыми не расставайтесь, 1980) as Homak
 The Old New Year (Cтаpый Нoвый гoд, 1981) as Ivan Adamych
 Chyornaya kuritsa, ili Podzemnye zhiteli (1981) as Batyushka
 Rozhdyonnye burey (1981) as polkovnik Heise
 Waiting for Love (Любимая женщина механика Гаврилова, 1982) as Rita's uncle
 I Still Love, I Still Hope (Ещё люблю, ещё надеюсь, 1983) as Vasiliy Vasilyevich
 We Are from Jazz (Мы из джаза, 1983) as Papa
 Demidovs (Демидовы, 1984) as Nikita Antufiev-Demidov
 And Life, and Tears, and Love (1984) as Stepanych
 Skazki starogo volshebnika (1985) as New king
 I Still Love, I Still Hope (1985) as Vasiliy Vasilyevich
 Man with an Accordion (1985) as Ivan Lopatin
 Winter Evening in Gagra (Зимний вечер в Гаграх, 1985) as Aleksey Ivanovich Beglov
 Dzhek Vosmyorkin, amerikanets (1986) as Admiral Katsaurov
 The Pathfinder (1987) as Sahen
 She with a Broom, He in a Black Hat (Она с метлой, он в чёрной шляпе, 1987) as Raven (voice)
 Gardemarines ahead! (Гардемарины, вперёд!, 1988, TV Mini-Series) as Alexey Bestuzhev-Ryumin
 Moonzund (Моонзунд, 1988) as Nikolai Essen
 Zerograd (Город Зеро, 1988) as a museum curator
 Heart of a Dog (Собачье сердце, 1988, TV Movie) as Professor Philip Philipovich Preobrazhensky
 Tree Sticks! (Ёлки-палки!, 1988) as Yuri Viktorovich
 New Adventures of a Yankee in King Arthur's Court (Новые приключения янки при дворе короля Артура, 1988) as an archbishop
 The Feasts of Belshazzar, or a Night with Stalin (Пиры Валтасара, или Ночь со Сталиным, 1989) as Mikhail Kalinin
 Kanuvshee vremya (1989)
 Bindyuzhnik i korol (1989) as Nikifor
 Yama (1990)
 Shapka (1990) as Konstantin Baranov
 Desyat let bez prava perepiski (1990)
 His Nickname Is Beast (1990) as The Old Convict
 Sons of Bitches (Сукины дети, 1991) as Andrey Ivanovich Nanaytsev
 Viva Gardes-Marines! (Виват, гардемарины!, 1991) as Alexey Bestuzhev-Ryumin
 Nochnye zabavy (1991) as Andryushenko, saxophonist
 The Voice in the Wilderness (1991) as Hangman
 Lavka Rubinchik i... (1992)
 Kak zhivyote, karasi? (1992) as Karas'-emigrant
 Gardes-Marines III (Гардемарины-III, 1992) as Alexey Bestuzhev-Ryumin
 Dreams of Russia (Сны о России, 1992) as Bush, the court gardener
 Yermak (Ермак, 1996, TV Mini-Series) as Ivan the Terrible (voiced by Sergei Artsibashev) (final appearance)

References

External links

Yevgeny Yevstigneyev at the Moscow Art Theatre website
Biography of Yevgeny Yevstigneyev 
Yevstigneyev Yevgeny Aleksandrovich 
  Слёзы и любовь Евгения Евстигнеева

1926 births
1992 deaths
20th-century Russian male actors
Actors from Nizhny Novgorod
Communist Party of the Soviet Union members
Academic staff of High Courses for Scriptwriters and Film Directors
Moscow Art Theatre School alumni
Academic staff of Moscow Art Theatre School
Honored Artists of the RSFSR
People's Artists of the RSFSR
People's Artists of the USSR
Recipients of the Order of Lenin
Recipients of the Order of the Red Banner of Labour
Recipients of the USSR State Prize
Recipients of the Vasilyev Brothers State Prize of the RSFSR
Russian male film actors
Russian male stage actors
Russian male voice actors
Soviet male film actors
Soviet male stage actors
Soviet male voice actors
Burials at Novodevichy Cemetery